Stylidium spathulatum is a dicotyledonous plant that belongs to the genus Stylidium (family Stylidiaceae). The species is informally named the creamy triggerplant for the colour of its flowers.

The flowers are yellowish-white and appear between October and January. These are presented on a scape, 0.05 to 0.5 metres above the ground, which is glandular at the base and glabrous on the upper parts. The leaves are spathulate, or inversely lance-shaped, tufted and spread out just above ground level. It is found on dunes, granite outcrops, swamps and other moist areas, amongst Eucalypts, heathland or shrubs.

It is found in the Southwest Botanical Province of Western Australia. The species was first described by Robert Brown in his Prodromus Florae Novae Hollandiae of 1810, based on a collection he made in his visit to King George Sound in 1801. The lectotype's locality is noted as Princess Royal Harbour, King George Sound.

See also 
 List of Stylidium species

References 

Carnivorous plants of Australia
Eudicots of Western Australia
rupestre
Asterales of Australia
Plants described in 1810